The term Pneumonia front, first coined by the National Weather Service in Milwaukee in the 1960s, is used to describe a rare meteorological phenomenon observed on the western shoreline of Lake Michigan during Spring and early Summer. These fronts are defined as lake-modified synoptic scale cold fronts that result in one-hour temperature drops of 16 °F (8.9 °C) or greater.

They do not necessarily have to be synoptic, or large scale, cold fronts. Under weak prevailing winds, a density current can often develop in the form of a lake breeze that moves from that water to the adjacent shoreline and several miles inland. This "lake-breeze cold front" can drop temperature in places like Chicago, Milwaukee, Benton Harbor, and Green Bay significantly as they cross the area.

There has been many times during spring games at Wrigley Field where people, who may have traveled far to the lakeshore of Lake Michigan from an inland location to watch an afternoon game, only to feel the effects of the "pneumonia front" as that cold blast of air comes through.

The following are documented occurrences of a lake modified synoptic scale cold front or a "pneumonia front".

References

External links
"Synoptic and Local Controls of the Lake Michigan Pneumonia Front", C. Behnke, M.S. Thesis, University of Wisconsin - Milwaukee (2005)
CIMSS Satellite Blog

Anomalous weather
Weather fronts
Lake Michigan
Weather and health